Coleophora kargani is a moth of the family Coleophoridae. It is found in southern Russia and central Asia. It occurs in semi-desert biotopes.

Adults are on wing from June to July.

The larvae feed on Caroxylon dendroides and possibly Kochia prostrata. They feed on the generative organs of their host plant.

References

kargani
Moths described in 1989
Moths of Asia